Angela Allen may refer to:

 Angela Allen, a member of Carmen (band)
 Angela Allen, from the 2009 Plymouth child abuse case
 Angela Allen MBE, winner of the 2005 BAFTA Outstanding British Contribution to Cinema Award
 Angela Allen, women's winner of the 1996 Stroud Half Marathon
 Angela Allen, elected mayor of Tar Heel, North Carolina in 2003 as a write-in candidate
 Angela Allen, marketing coordinator for Good Girl Gone Bad